This is a list of cannabis seizures notable for record-setting size or social precedent.

*Assumed dried leaf or flower material unless otherwise specified.
†May not be independently verified

References

Sources
 

Seizures